Bees Saal Baad may refer to:

 Bees Saal Baad (1962 film), starring Biswajeet and Waheeda Rehman
 Bees Saal Baad (1988 film), starring  Mithun Chakraborty, Dimple Kapadia and Meenakshi Sheshadri